"Rock Island Line" is an American folk song. Ostensibly about the Chicago, Rock Island and Pacific Railroad, it appeared as a folk song as early as 1929. The first recorded performance of "Rock Island Line" was by inmates of the Arkansas Cummins State Farm prison in 1934.

The beginning of the most popular version of the song tells the story of a train operator who smuggles pig iron through a toll gate by claiming all he had on board was livestock, but this episode was a later addition not present in the traditional, 1929 version.
The song's chorus includes:

Many artists subsequently recorded it, often changing the verses and adjusting the lyrics.

History 
The earliest known version of "Rock Island Line" was written in 1929 by Clarence Wilson, a member of the Rock Island Colored Booster Quartet, a singing group made up of employees of the Chicago, Rock Island and Pacific Railroad at the Biddle Shops freight yard in Little Rock, Arkansas. The lyrics to this version are largely different from the version that later evolved and became famous, with verses describing people and activities associated with the yard.

The first audio recording of the song was made by folklorist and musicologist John A. Lomax at the Tucker, Arkansas prison farm on September 29, 1934. Lead Belly accompanied Lomax to the prison. This version retains some lyrical features of the 1929 version, but also features key elements of the "classic" version. A similar version was recorded by Lomax in October 1934 at Cummins State Farm prison in Lincoln County, Arkansas, performed by a group of singers led by Kelly Pace.

The Penguin Book Of American Folk Songs, compiled and with notes by Alan Lomax, published in 1964, includes "Rock Island Line" with the following footnote:

According to Harry Lewman Music,

Lonnie Donegan's recording, released as a single in late 1955, signaled the start of the UK skiffle craze. This recording featured Donegan, Chris Barber on double bass and Beryl Bryden on washboard. The Acoustic Music organization makes this comment about Donegan's version. "It flew up the English charts. Donegan had synthesized American Southern Blues with simple acoustic instruments: acoustic guitar, washtub bass and washboard rhythm. The new style was called 'Skiffle' ....  and referred to music from people with little money for instruments. The new style captivated an entire generation of post-war youth in England."

Pete Seeger recorded a version a cappella while he was chopping wood, to demonstrate its origins.

Renditions
"Rock Island Line" has been recorded by:

1930s–1940s
Prison inmates in Arkansas – Recorded by John Lomax in Arkansas twice in 1934. The October 1934 recording, by Kelly Pace and a group of convicts, was released on the compilation album A Treasury of Library of Congress Field Recordings (released 1997)
Lead Belly – Recorded in Washington, D.C. on June 22, 1937, the first of many recordings he made during his career, the last being live at the University of Texas at Austin on June 15, 1949.  "Rock Island Line" appears on the Lead Belly compilation Rock Island Line: Original 1935-1943 Recordings (released 2003), among many others.
Arkansas prisoners – Also recorded by John Lomax in 1939. This performance is included with his 1939 Southern States Recording Trip.

1950s
George Melly (single 1951) – Recorded for the small British Jazz label Tempo (which was subsequently acquired by Decca) under the name "The George Melly Trio", and featuring Johnny Parker on piano and Norman Dodsworth on drums (both members of Mick Mulligan's Magnolia Jazz Band with whom Melly was the singer).
Odetta as part of the duo Odetta and Larry The Tin Angel 1954
Lonnie Donegan (single 1955) – In July 1954 Donegan recorded this fast-tempo version of "Rock Island Line", with Chris Barber's Jazz Band. It was the first debut record to be certified gold in the UK, where it helped trigger the skiffle craze. The single reached the top ten in the US, peaking at number eight. This record is quoted by various later famous musicians as a catalyst for their musical development. Donegan embellished Lead Belly's earlier lyrics with an account of how the locomotive engineer fooled a toll-collector by misrepresenting his load of pig-iron as livestock, which was not chargeable, but this is based on his misunderstanding of the railroad phrase “in the hole” (meaning in the siding); the original meaning was  merely that the engineer avoided a wait in the siding because trains carrying livestock were given priority.
Bobby Darin (single 1956) – Bobby Darin's debut single was a 1956 recording of "Rock Island Line", with "rhythm accompaniment directed by Jack Pleis" for Decca Records.
Don Cornell (single 1956) – Recorded for Coral, an early American cover version following the success of Lonnie Donegan's record in the US charts.
Stan Freberg (single 1956) – In his typical manner, Freberg parodied Lonnie Donegan's "Rock Island Line", following the latter's American chart success. Issued on Capitol, it was the B-side to Freberg's parody of Elvis Presley's "Heartbreak Hotel".
Merrill Moore with Cliffie Stone's Orchestra – single (April 1956)
The Weavers – The Weavers' Greatest Hits (1957)
Johnny Cash – Johnny Cash with His Hot and Blue Guitar (1957) and also issued as Sun Records EP112 as a single - Cash adds two verses to the song, one about a train coming down the track and the second about an engineer indicating two beverages he wants to try before he dies: "a hot cup of coffee and a cold glass of tea."
Milt Okun – America's Best Loved Folk Songs, Baton BL1203 (1957)
Johnny Horton – 1956–1960, recorded in 1957, released posthumously
Snooks Eaglin – New Orleans Street Singer, SFW CD 40165 (1959)
The Tarriers – The Tarriers (1957)
Woody Guthrie and Sonny Terry (1955)
Gateway Singers (1957)

1960s
The Brothers Four – The Brothers Four Song Book, CS8497 (1961)
Ramblin' Jack Elliot – Young Brigham (1968)

1970s
Harry Belafonte – On Belafonte, later released on the CDs All Time Greatest Hits Vol. 3 and 36 All-Time Greatest Hits.
Johnny Cash (single 1970) – from the album Rock Island Line (1970), the single reached number 93 (US Singles Chart), and number 35 (US Country chart). Cash previously recorded the song in 1957.
Sonny Terry and Brownie McGhee – Blues Masters (1991)
Whiskey Howl – A cappella version by the Toronto blues band on their 1972 eponymous album
John Lennon – Acoustic and unreleased version found on the bootleg, The Lost Lennon Tapes
George Harrison and Paul Simon – Acoustic version performed during rehearsal for November 20, 1976 episode of Saturday Night Live
Graham Bonnet – On the album Graham Bonnet (1977)

1980s
The Knitters – Poor Little Critter on the Road (1985)
The Washington Squares – The Washington Squares (1987)
Mano Negra – Patchanka (1988)
Little Richard & Fishbone – Folkways: A Vision Shared—A Tribute to Woody Guthrie and Leadbelly (1988)
Boxcar Willie (1983)

1990s
Devil in a Woodpile (with Jane Baxter Miller) (single 1999) – On the album Poor Little Knitter on the Road - A Tribute to the Knitters

2000s
Odetta – Looking for a Home (2001)
Dan Zanes and Friends – Family Dance (2001)
Long John Baldry – Remembering Leadbelly (2001)
Chris Thomas King – Johnny's Blues: A Tribute to Johnny Cash (2003)
Eleven Hundred Springs – Bandwagon (2004)
The Reverend Peyton's Big Damn Band – The Gospel Album (2007)

2010s
Ringo Starr – Ringo 2012 (2012)
Billy Bragg and Joe Henry - Shine a Light: Field Recordings from the Great American Railroad (2016)
Eric Church (2017) 61 Days in Church (2017)

References

External links
"Rock Island Line" on Allmusic
Oldielyrics.com, Lonnie Donegan's version of "Rock Island Line"
A Mighty Good Road: Minnesota Public Radio
Traditional Music and Spoken Word Catalog, American Folklife Center, Library of Congress

Blues songs
Rockabilly songs
American folk songs
Lead Belly songs
Johnny Cash songs
Odetta songs
1955 debut singles
Lonnie Donegan songs
Pete Seeger songs
Songs written by Lead Belly
Songs about trains
1929 songs
Songwriter unknown